Mirriam Chinyama Chonya (born 25 January 1971) is a Zambian politician.

Chonya is a member of the National Assembly of Zambia for Kafue. She is a member of the United Party for National Development.

References

Living people
1971 births
Zambian politicians
United Party for National Development politicians
Place of birth missing (living people)
21st-century Zambian women politicians
21st-century Zambian politicians